German submarine U-201 was a Type VIIC U-boat of the Kriegsmarine in World War II.

The submarine was laid down on 20 January 1940 by Friedrich Krupp Germaniawerft yard at Kiel as yard number 630, launched on 7 December 1940, and commissioned on 25 January 1941 under the command of Kapitänleutnant Adalbert Schnee. Attached to the 1st U-boat Flotilla, she made nine successful patrols in the North Atlantic, the last two under the command of Oberleutnant zur See Günther Rosenberg. She was a member of eight wolfpacks.

She was sunk on 17 February 1943 in the North Atlantic, by depth charges from a British warship. All 49 hands were lost.

Design
German Type VIIC submarines were preceded by the shorter Type VIIB submarines. U-201 had a displacement of  when at the surface and  while submerged. She had two shafts and two  propellers.

U-201 was fitted with five  torpedo tubes (four fitted at the bow and one at the stern), fourteen torpedoes, one  SK C/35 naval gun, 220 rounds, and a  C/30 anti-aircraft gun. The boat had a complement of between forty-four and sixty.

Service history

First patrol
U-201 departed Kiel for her first patrol on 22 April 1941. Her route took her across the North Sea, through the gap separating Iceland and the Faroe Islands and into the Atlantic Ocean. Her first 'kill' was Capulet which she sank on 2 May south of Iceland.

Moving east of Greenland, she sank Greglia on 9 May and damaged Empire Cloud on the same day.

She was attacked over five hours by three escorts from Convoy OB-318. A total of 99 depth charges were dropped, severely damaging the boat, but she escaped. She docked at Lorient in occupied France on 18 May.

Second patrol
The submarine's second foray passed without major incident: starting on 8 June 1941, finishing on 19 July but in Brest. (For the rest of her career she would be based in this French Atlantic port).

Third patrol
U-201s third sortie began from Brest on 14 August 1941. On the 19th in mid-Atlantic she took part in a wolfpack attack on Convoy OG 71. Firing one spread of four torpedoes she hit the cargo ship Ciscar and passenger liner , which was carrying the Convoy Commodore and 86 other Royal Navy personnel. Both ships sank, and Aguilas sinking killed 152 of the 168 people aboard, including all but one of the naval staff.

U-201 continued with the concerted attack on OG 71, sinking the Irish Clonlara on 22 August and British merchants Aldergrove and Stork northwest of Lisbon on the 23rd, before returning to Brest on the 25th.

Fourth patrol
Success continued to accompany U-201. Having departed Brest on 14 September 1941 she sank Runa, Lissa and Rhineland, all on 21 September.

She then sank Cervantes on 27 September. This ship had four survivors from Ciscar on board. One torpedo was seen to pass between Springbank and Leadgate, but two others sealed the British vessel's fate.

The submarine's final victim on this patrol was Margareta, which went down southwest of Cape Clear.

U-201 returned to Brest on 30 September.

Fifth patrol
On U-201s fifth sortie; she failed to find any targets.

Sixth patrol
U-201 commenced her sixth and longest patrol on 24 March 1942. The crew, realizing that the ship, despite the torpedo strike, was not settling, decided to stay on board. The U-boat men saw the neutrality markings only after a second torpedo was fired and the submarine had surfaced. Victorias complement then abandoned its vessel; U-201 reported its mistake to the BdU (U-boat headquarters) which ordered it to clear the area, which it did.

, an American minesweeper towing the barge YOG-38, picked up Victorias distress signals and sent a boarding party across to the tanker to effect repairs. The ship reached New York on 21 April and after much legal wrangling, was repaired and requisitioned by the US government and returned to service in July. She survived the war.

Three more ships went to the bottom on this patrol - Bris on 21 April, SS San Jacinto (1903) and Derryheen, both on 22 April.

The boat returned to Brest on 21 May.

Seventh patrol
Patrol number seven was in tonnage terms, the boat's most successful. Casualties were increased when a torpedo exploded under a lifeboat that had just been lowered from the ship and the remaining lifeboats became separated, one spending 20 days at sea before being rescued and another being lost without trace.

The Siris went down on the same day after a torpedo and 100 rounds from the deck gun.

Three more ships were sunk before the submarine returned to Brest on 8 August.

Eighth patrol
So it went on; this time in the waters off South America. Another three ships met their end.

The 48 survivors were spotted by a Yugoslavian merchant ship, but when they learned of the prospect of an unescorted Atlantic crossing to Durban, opted to remain in their lifeboats until they reached the mouth of the River Marowijine.

Ninth patrol and loss
The boat left Brest for the last time on 3 January 1943 and headed for the eastern coast of Canada.

49 men died; there were no survivors.

Previously recorded fate
This attack sank .

Wolfpacks
U-201 took part in eight wolfpacks, namely:
 West (8 – 13 May 1941) 
 Kurfürst (16 – 20 June 1941) 
 Störtebecker (5 – 19 November 1941) 
 Gödecke (19 – 25 November 1941) 
 Letzte Ritter (25 November - 4 December 1941) 
 Hai (3 – 20 July 1942) 
 Falke (8 – 19 January 1943) 
 Haudegen (19 January - 15 February 1943)

Summary of raiding history

References

Notes

Citations

Bibliography

External links

1940 ships
German Type VIIC submarines
Ships built in Bremen (state)
Ships lost with all hands
U-boats commissioned in 1941
U-boats sunk by depth charges
U-boats sunk in 1943
U-boats sunk by British warships
World War II submarines of Germany
Maritime incidents in February 1943